Pearlwort is a common name for several plants and may refer to:

 Sagina
 Colobanthus